Höfer (also spelled Hoefer) is a German surname, derived from Hof (yard, court), which refer to:

Candida Höfer (born 1944), German photographer, daughter of Werner Höfer
Edmund Hoefer (1819–1882), German novelist and literary historian
Ferdinand Hoefer (1811–1878), German-French physician
Hermann Höfer (1934–1996), German footballer
Karl Höfer (1862–1939), German general
Karlgeorg Hoefer (1914–2000), German typographer and calligrapher
Regina Höfer (born 1947), German former athlete
Ulrich Höfer (born 1957), German professor of physics
Werner Höfer (1913–1997), German journalist

See also
Hofer (disambiguation)
Hoffa (disambiguation)
Hoffer

German-language surnames